The CFA Institute is a global, not-for-profit professional organization that provides investment professionals with finance education. The institute aims to promote standards in ethics, education, and professional excellence in the global investment services industry.  Since 1945, the institute has published the peer-reviewed, quarterly journal, the Financial Analysts Journal.  It also publishes the Enterprising Investor blog.

Structure
The organization offers the Chartered Financial Analyst (CFA) designation, the Certificate in Investment Performance Measurement (CIPM), the Certificate in ESG Investing, and the Investment Foundations Certificate. It provides continuing education conferences, seminars, webcasts, and publications to allow members and other participants to stay current on developments in the investment industry. CFA Institute also oversees the CFA Institute Research Challenge for university students and the Research Foundation of CFA Institute.

CFA Institute is headquartered in Charlottesville, Virginia, United States, with additional offices in New York City, Washington, D.C., London, Hong Kong, Mumbai, Beijing, Shanghai and Abu Dhabi. The current President and CEO is Margaret Franklin.

History

In 1947, four financial analyst societies—Boston, Chicago, New York, and Philadelphia — cooperated for the purpose of promoting the exchange of ideas and supporting the welfare of their profession, calling the new group the National Federation of Financial Analysts Societies (NFFAS). In 1959, the NFFAS Board of Directors approved the establishment of the Institute of Chartered Financial Analysts (ICFA), which was incorporated in 1962.  NFFAS changed its name to the Financial Analysts Federation (FAF) in 1961.

In 1962, the Chartered Financial Analyst (CFA) designation and code of conduct were established. In 1963, the profession was formalized when 284 candidates sat for the first CFA exam and 268 CFA charters were awarded. The following year, all 3 levels of the exam were administered to more than 1,700 candidates.

The Association for Investment Management and Research (AIMR) was founded in 1990 as the umbrella organization for the ICFA and the FAF, still separate entities at that time.  ICFA and the FAF consolidated under AIMR in 1999.

In 2004, the Association for Investment Management and Research voted to change its name to the CFA Institute.

In February 2019, The United States Department of Justice announced it will fine CFA Institute more than $320,000 for discriminating against qualified American workers by hiring temporary foreign workers through the H-1B visa program.

Given the COVID-19 pandemic, CFA Institute has cancelled the majority of the examinations around the world due to the lack of examination facilities in 2020. From 2021 onwards, all examinations were shifted to computer-based testing for the three levels of the CFA program.

In March 2021, CFA Institute launched the Certificate in ESG Investing due to the increasing importance of environmental, social and corporate governance (ESG) factors in socially responsible investing.

References

External links
 
 About the CFA Institute and Charter

Analyst societies
Business and finance professional associations
Companies based in Virginia
Organizations established in 1947